Wig Out may refer to:
 "Wig-Out", a 1986 song by Died Pretty from Free Dirt
 "Wig Out", a 1992 song by  Pete Rock & CL Smooth from Mecca and the Soul Brother

See also